Pikes Peak Ocean to Ocean Highway was an early coast-to-coast highway in the United States.  The completed route went from New York City to Los Angeles, and was in direct competition with the Lincoln Highway and the National Old Trails Road. Its route markers were marked PP-OO.

It started as a boosterism campaign in Colorado Springs, and depended upon cities and towns along the route to participate with monetary contributions and road improvements. It was formalized March 18, 1914, at a meeting in St. Joseph, Missouri, with state and federal highway officials. The highway was completed in 1924.

Originally the route was to be from Washington, D.C., to San Francisco, California, but the existence of the good National Old Trails Road in the east made New York City a natural terminus, and competition with the Lincoln Highway and the ease of the southern route to California determined the change to Los Angeles.

The route through Colorado took two different paths from Colorado Springs to Grand Junction. The first went through Manitou, Buena Vista, Leadville, and Glenwood Springs and the second went through Canon City, Salida, Montrose and Delta.

Route
East to West
New York: 
New York City
New Jersey: 
Trenton
Pennsylvania: 
Philadelphia
Harrisburg
Hollidaysburg
Blairsville
Washington
Ohio: primarily State route 7, State route 151, U.S. Route 22, U.S. Route 250, U.S. Route 36, State route 751, U.S. Route 36, State route 571
Coshocton 
Bellefontaine
Indiana: primarily what became State Road 32 and what became U.S. Route 136
Anderson
Illinois: 
Danville
Decatur
Springfield
Missouri: primarily State Route MM, and what became U.S. Route 36
Hannibal
Chillicothe
St Joseph
Kansas: primarily what became U.S. Route 36 and U.S. Route 24
Marysville
Colby
Colorado: 
Limon
Colorado Springs
 First route through Glenwood Springs
 Second route through Montrose
Grand Junction
Utah: 
Price
Beaver
St. George
Shivwits
Arizona: primarily what became old U.S. Route 91, now a county road
Beaver Dam, Arizona
Littlefield, Arizona
Nevada: 
Las Vegas
California: 
Barstow
San Bernardino
Pasadena
Los Angeles

References

External links
 "Pikes Peak Ocean to Ocean Highway" US Dep't of Transportation
 "Pikes Peak Ocean to Ocean Highway map archives" US Dep't of Transportation
 Rick Martin's "Pikes Peak Ocean to Ocean Highway" website 

Auto trails in the United States